Bacon End is a hamlet in the civil parish of Great Canfield, and near Great Canfield Castle, in Essex, England.

References

External links
mid 20th Century Aerial Photograph

Hamlets in Essex
Uttlesford